Kungkari (also Gunggari, Koonkerri, Kuungkari) is an extinct and unclassified Australian Aboriginal language. The Kungkari language region included the landscape within the local government boundaries of the Longreach Shire Council and Blackall-Tambo Shire Council.

Classification 
Geographically it lay near the Barcoo River between the Karnic and Maric languages, but had no obvious connection to either; the data is too poor to draw any conclusions on classification.

Bowern (2001) mentions Kungkari as a possible Karnic language.

Wafer and Lissarrague (2008) report that a description of Kungkari by Breen (1990) is of Kungkari, not the similarly-named Gunggari, which was Maric.

References

Unclassified languages of Australia
Karnic languages
Extinct languages of Queensland

External links 

 Kuungkari, Bidjara, Inangai & Wangkangurru (Central West Region) community language journey digital story, at State Library of Queensland